The 1999–2000 Alabama Crimson Tide men's basketball team (variously "Alabama", "UA", "Bama" or "The Tide") represented the University of Alabama in the 1999–2000 college basketball season. The head coach was Mark Gottfried, who was in his second season at Alabama. The team played its home games at Coleman Coliseum in Tuscaloosa, Alabama and was a member of the Southeastern Conference. This was the 88th season of basketball in the school's history. The Crimson Tide finished the season 13–16, 6–10 in SEC play, they lost in the first round of the 2000 SEC men's basketball tournament.

Schedule and results

|-
!colspan=12 style=|Non-conference regular season

|-
!colspan=12 style=|SEC regular season

|-
!colspan=12 style=| SEC tournament

See also
1999–2000 NCAA Division I men's basketball season
1999–2000 NCAA Division I men's basketball rankings

References

Alabama
Alabama Crimson Tide men's basketball seasons
1999 in sports in Alabama
Alabama Crimson Tide